To have a head for heights  means that one has no acrophobia, an irrational fear of heights, and is not particularly prone to fear of falling or suffering from vertigo, the spinning sensation that can be triggered, for example, by looking down from a high place.

A head for heights is frequently cited as a requirement when mountain hiking or climbing for a particular route as well as paragliding and hang-gliding. It is needed for certain jobs, such as for wind turbine technicians, chimney sweeps, roofers, steeplejacks and window cleaners.
Mohawk ironworkers have worked for generations erecting New York City skyscrapers,
though it is a myth they have an innate skill for doing so.

Unlike acrophobia, a natural fear of heights is a normal phenomenon. When one finds oneself in an exposed place at a great height, one feels one's own posture as unstable. A normal fear of heights can generate feelings of anxiety as well as autonomic symptoms like outbreaks of sweat.

Causes of fear of heights 

There are logical biological causes of fear of falling. Firstly, there is the innate so-called "cliff edge phenomenon", whereby even toddlers, as well as many animals, avoid large drops, even without having previously had a bad experience.

Vertigo itself is caused by a destabilization of the posture which, when it occurs at height, results from too large a distance from the eyes to the nearest visible solid object and is referred to as "distance vertigo" or "height vertigo". In order to see the object in space, the head starts to sway imperceptibly and "location reflex" then causes the body to sway with it. At the same time, the body stabilizes its position using the periphery of the retina, but when someone looks down they now lack this stabilizing factor. This physiological swaying is normally counteracted by the body's vestibular system and proprioceptive sense. However, for example, if there is damage to the sense of balance, in fact, the risk of falling is increased.

References

Literature 
 Martin Roos: Wenn die Höhe zur Hölle wird. In: DAV Panorama 1/2008, ISSN 1437-5923
 Pepi Stückl/Georg Sojer: Bergsteigen: Lehrbuch für alle Spielarten des Bergsteigens, Bruckmann, Munich, 1996, 

Climbing and health
Hiking